Ambrose Lee Siu-kwong  (17 August 1948 – 14 August 2022)  was a Hong Kong politician, Secretary for Security of Hong Kong and a member of the Executive Council. He was appointed to his post on 5 August 2003, replacing Regina Ip.

Background
Lee graduated from The University of Hong Kong with a Bachelor Degree of Science in Electrical Engineering and also pursued administrative development and senior executive studies at Tsinghua University, University of Oxford, Harvard University.

He joined the civil service in 1974 as an immigration officer, rising to become Assistant Director of Immigration in 1995 and Deputy Director of Immigration two years later. He served as Director of Immigration between 1998 and 2002. He was appointed the Commissioner of the Independent Commission Against Corruption in July 2002.

Death
Lee died at his home in the Sha Tin neighbourhood on 14 August 2022, three days before his 74th birthday, after sustaining a fall.

References

1948 births
2022 deaths
Accidental deaths from falls
Accidental deaths in Hong Kong
Alumni of the University of Hong Kong
Alumni of the Hong Kong Polytechnic University
Government officials of Hong Kong
Harvard University alumni
Hong Kong civil servants
Delegates to the 12th National People's Congress from Hong Kong